Wyre Borough Council elections are held every four years. Wyre Borough Council is the local authority for the non-metropolitan district of Wyre in Lancashire, England. Since the last boundary changes in 2015, 50 councillors have been elected from 24 wards.

Political control
The first election to the council was held in 1973, initially operating as a shadow authority before coming into its powers on 1 April 1974. Since 1973 political control of the council has been held by the following parties:

Leadership
The leaders of the council since 2010 have been:

Council elections
1973 Wyre Borough Council election
1976 Wyre Borough Council election
1979 Wyre Borough Council election (New ward boundaries)
1983 Wyre Borough Council election
1987 Wyre Borough Council election
1991 Wyre Borough Council election
1995 Wyre Borough Council election
1999 Wyre Borough Council election
2003 Wyre Borough Council election (New ward boundaries reduced the number of seats by 1)
2007 Wyre Borough Council election
2011 Wyre Borough Council election
2015 Wyre Borough Council election (New ward boundaries)
2019 Wyre Borough Council election

Election results

Borough result maps

By-election results

1995-1999

1999-2003

2003-2007

2007-2011

2011-2015

2015-2019

2019-2022

References

By-election results

External links
Wyre Council

 
Local government in the Borough of Wyre
Politics of Wyre
Council elections in Lancashire
District council elections in England